Reservoir Records is jazz record label founded in 1987 by Mark and Kayla Feldman, with special attention given to a piano series. Its catalogue includes music by Kenny Barron, Nick Brignola, Steve Kuhn, Hod O'Brien, Claudio Roditi Pepper Adams, Tommy Flanagan, Al Grey, Peter Leitch, J. R. Monterose, Ralph Moore, Valery Ponomarev, Joe Puma, Don Sickler, and Buddy Tate.

Artists

Kenny Barron
Steve Kuhn
Claudio Roditi
John Hicks
Helio Alves
Dick Katz
Nick Brignola
Valery Ponomarev
Gary Smulyan
Ralph Moore
J. R. Monterose
Joe Puma
Dick Berk
Jon Mayer
John Fedchock
Don Sickler
Roni Ben-Hur
Peter Leitch

Discography

External links
Discogs label entry

References

American record labels
Jazz record labels